The Dourdou de Conques (literally Dourdou of Conques) is an  long river in the department of Aveyron, southern France. Its source is near the village of Lassouts. It flows generally west. It is a left tributary of the Lot, into which it flows near Grand-Vabre.

Communes along its course
The following list is ordered from source to mouth: 
 Aveyron: Lassouts, Palmas-d'Aveyron, Gabriac, Bozouls, Rodelle, Muret-le-Château, Villecomtal, Pruines, Mouret, Nauviale, Conques-en-Rouergue

References

Rivers of France
Rivers of Occitania (administrative region)
Rivers of Aveyron